Grahame Wood (born 1970) is a British–American actor born in Toronto Canada.  His career has kept him busy in L.A., London, Toronto, and Vancouver.  He is best known for his performance in the Roland Emmerich epic, The Patriot, and continues to forge a career out of playing the layered bad guy. Commenting on his death scene in Saving Private Ryan, Steven Spielberg proclaimed, "That was better than the opening credits of ER!"

Film/Television

Grahame was trained at Britain's oldest drama school, LAMDA. As well as The Patriot and Saving Private Ryan Grahame was in the Emmy Award nominated movie, 4 Minutes, Grahame portrayed celebrated runner, Sir Christopher Chataway. He played the role of ‘Gordon’ on the ABC Family series, Falcon Beach, and has guest-starred on numerous television series. Grahame has spent the past two decades working in the film and television industries of the U.S., Canada and UK – playing both Americans and Brits – as well as writing and producing....

Grahame was executive producer of the rock doc, Saturday Night at Morley Gibson's.  He produced and wrote The Angel Chronicles, in development with Insight Productions and CTV from 2008 to 2011.  He is currently in development on the cop drama, Moon Rising, with Devilishly Good Productions in L.A.

Novels

Grahame's DARKLY STEWART novel series of dark thrillers about RCMP Constable, Darkly Stewart, is currently out to production companies for television adaptation consideration.  Negotiation on a print publisher for the novels is currently underway.

Links to film and television credits

Notes

1970 births
Living people
British male film actors
Alumni of the London Academy of Music and Dramatic Art
Canadian male film actors
Canadian male television actors
British male television actors